The WZ-9 is a turboshaft engine developed by the Aviation Industry Corporation of China. It entered production in 2009.

Specifications (WZ-9)

References

Aviation in China
2010s turboshaft engines